László Papp (25 March 1926 – 16 October 2003) was a Hungarian professional boxer from Budapest. He was left-handed and won gold medals in the 1948 Summer Olympics in London, the 1952 Summer Olympics in Helsinki, and the 1956 Summer Olympics held in Melbourne, Australia. In his final Olympic competition he became the first boxer in Olympic history to win three successive gold medals. He won 12 of his 13 Olympic fights without losing a round, dropping only one, in his last Olympic final, to American boxer José Torres. 
There was not another triple gold medalist for 20 years, when Teófilo Stevenson won three, followed by Félix Savón as the third of the three men to accomplish the feat.

Amateur career
Papp was an Olympic gold medalist three times, at middleweight in London in 1948, then as a light middleweight in Helsinki in 1952 and in Melbourne in 1956.  
Papp also was the European amateur middleweight champion as a middleweight in 1949 at Oslo and at light middleweight at Milan 1951.  He scored 55 first-round knockouts as an amateur, his record was 301-12-6.

Olympic results
1948 London (England)
Defeated Valfrid Resko (Finland) KO 2
Defeated Jean Welter (Luxembourg) KO 1
Defeated Auguste Cavignac (Belgium) KO 1
Defeated Ivano Fontana (Italy) 3-0
Defeated John Wright (England) 3-0

1952 Helsinki (Finland)
Defeated Ellsworth Webb (United States) KO 2
Defeated Charlie Chase (Canada) KO 2
Defeated Petar Stankoff Spassoff (Bulgaria) 3-0
Defeated Eladio Oscar Herrera (Argentina) 3-0
Defeated Theunis Jacobus van Schalkwyk (South Africa) 3-0

1956 Melbourne (Australia)
Defeated Alberto Saenz (Argentina) KO 3
Defeated Zbigniew Pietrzykowski (Poland) 3-0
Defeated José Torres (USA) 2-1

Professional career
Papp, despite having hand trouble, turned professional in 1957 and immediately began rising in the Middleweight ranks. However, Hungary was a Communist country at the time and professional boxing was not permitted. Papp had to travel to Vienna, in Austria, for training and for his fights. In spite of this disadvantage, he beat several top-ranking contenders for the European Middleweight title, including veteran Tiger Jones, French champion Hippolyte Annex and Chris Christensen. After Christensen, Papp defeated Randy Sandy of the United States. In 1964, after Papp had already signed up for the world championship title bout against Joey Giardello, Hungary's Communist leadership brought his professional career to an end by denying him an exit visa.

Papp is one of the few boxers in history to ever retire undefeated in the ring. His fighting record was 27 wins, 2 draws, and no losses. 15 of his wins were by way of knockout.

Death
László Papp died in Budapest in 2003.

Honours
Papp was inducted into the International Boxing Hall Of Fame in 2001.
In 1989 WBC President José Sulaimán gave Papp an award for 'Best amateur and professional boxer of all time' and granted him honorary champion status of the World Boxing Council.

Budapest's Papp László Sportaréna, a multipurpose building best known as a concert venue and the home ice of the Hungarian national hockey team, is named in his honour.

Professional boxing record

See also
 List of Hungarians

References

 His biography at Hungary.hu
 
 International Boxing Hall of Fame Bio

External links
 Official homepage

1926 births
2003 deaths
Olympic boxers of Hungary
Middleweight boxers
European Boxing Union champions
International Boxing Hall of Fame inductees
Boxers at the 1948 Summer Olympics
Boxers at the 1952 Summer Olympics
Boxers at the 1956 Summer Olympics
Boxers from Budapest
Olympic gold medalists for Hungary
Olympic medalists in boxing
Hungarian male boxers
Medalists at the 1956 Summer Olympics
Medalists at the 1952 Summer Olympics
Medalists at the 1948 Summer Olympics
Burials at Farkasréti Cemetery